Lake Angelus is a private, all-sports,  lake in Oakland County, in the U.S. state of Michigan.  The community of Lake Angelus is at the lake.

Lake Angelus is primarily located in Auburn Hills, except for a portion of the western portion of the lake which lies in Waterford Township.

Lake Angelus is the ninth-largest lake in Oakland County and the eighth-deepest lake in Oakland County.

Name
In the early 1900s, the lake was called Three Mile Lake. During the 1920s, the lake was renamed Lake Angelus by Mrs. Sollace B. Collidge.

References

Lakes of Oakland County, Michigan
Lakes of Waterford Township, Michigan